Blaze Pizza is a Pasadena, California-based fast-casual dining restaurant chain that serves pizza. Founded in 2011 by Elise and Rick Wetzel of Wetzel's Pretzels, Blaze Pizza was modeled after Chipotle's made-to-order approach to serving customers. Basketball player LeBron James is one of the original investors in the chain.

Concept 

Customers begin orders by choosing which of the toppings, sauces, and cheeses they would like on their pizza. As customers work their way down the service line, staff assemble a pizza based on customer instructions. Pizza are then "Fast Fire'd" in a high-temperature open-flame oven with an average cook time of 3 minutes.

Since the high-temperature gas-fired pizza oven is the only piece of cooking equipment inside each of the restaurants, the same oven is also used to roast the chicken, cook the Italian sausage and meatballs, and bake some of the desserts.

History 

Blaze Pizza was founded in Pasadena, California, by Rick and Elise Wetzel in 2011. The chain's first location was opened in Irvine, California, in August 2012, which was  followed two months later by the opening of their second, and flagship, location in October 2012 in Pasadena. During the first year of operation, the Irvine location grossed about $1.8 million and the Pasadena location grossed about $2.5 million.

Growth plan 
By the end of 2014, Blaze had become the first fast-casual pizza restaurant to achieve 50 opened units. At that time, the company had commitments with franchise partners to open 343 restaurants in 39 states. The chain had grown to $33 million in sales and $1.55 AUV in 2014. The company planned to have at least 500 locations by 2020. As of February 2022, the company has 332 restaurants in North America, 16 of which are located in Canada and the rest in the United States, as well as 10 locations in the Middle East.

International

Canada
In August 2015, the company announced plans to open its first location outside the U.S., in Toronto, Ontario, Canada. The first Canadian location was opened in Toronto in October 2015, followed by openings a few months later in Calgary in February 2016 and Edmonton in April 2016. In May 2018, the company opened its first location in the province of British Columbia in the city of Surrey.

In May 2022, the company expanded to Atlantic Canada. Opening its first location in St. John’s, Newfoundland and Labrador.

Middle East
In partnership with Alshaya, Blaze opened its first location outside of North America in the Middle Eastern nation of Kuwait in March 2018. In May 2018, Alshaya opened its first Blaze Pizza restaurant in Saudi Arabia in the capital city of Riyadh. In September 2018, Alshaya opened its first Blaze Pizza restaurant in Bahrain. In September 2019, Alshaya opened its first Blaze Pizza restaurant in the United Arab Emirates inside an Abu Dhabi shopping mall.

References

External links

Companies based in Pasadena, California
Fast casual restaurants
Pizza chains of the United States
Pizza franchises
Restaurants established in 2011
American companies established in 2011
2011 establishments in California